The 1950 Clemson Tigers football team was an American football team that represented Clemson College in the Southern Conference during the 1950 college football season. In its 11th season under head coach Frank Howard, the team compiled a 9–0–1 record (3–0–1 against conference opponents), finished second in the Southern Conference, was ranked No. 10 in the final AP Poll, defeated Miami (FL) in the 1951 Orange Bowl, and outscored all opponents by a total of 344 to 76. The team played its home games at Memorial Stadium in Clemson, South Carolina.

The team set numerous single-season school records, including most points scored (344), most rushing yards (2,800), most passing yards (1,411), and most combined passing and rushing yards (4,211). In addition, fullback and team captain Fred Cone set individual single-season school records in rushing yards (845), touchdowns (15), and points scored (92). Sophomore tailback Billy Hair led the team in passing yards with 644 and also rushed for 573 yards.

Fred Cone and end Glenn Smith were selected as first-team players on the 1950 All-Southern Conference football team. Four Clemson players were named to the All-South Carolina football team for 1950: Cone, Smith, tackle Bob Patton, and back Jackie Calvert.

Schedule

References

Clemson
Clemson Tigers football seasons
Orange Bowl champion seasons
College football undefeated seasons
Clemson Tigers football